Stevenson Peak is a peak, 1,780 m, standing 5 nautical miles (9 km) west-northwest, of Bypass Hill in the Cartographers Range, Victory Mountains, in Victoria Land. Mapped by United States Geological Survey (USGS) from surveys and U.S. Navy air photos, 1960–64. Named by Advisory Committee on Antarctic Names (US-ACAN) for Robert G. Stevenson, geologist at McMurdo Station, 1967–68.

Mountains of Victoria Land
Borchgrevink Coast